Gyasi may refer to the following people:

Given name
 Gyasi Ross, American author, attorney, rapper, speaker and storyteller
 Gyasi Zardes (born 1991), American association football player 

Surname
 Barbara Oteng Gyasi, Ghanaian politician and Deputy
 Daniel Gyasi (born 1994), Ghanaian sprinter 
 David Gyasi, British actor
 Dr. K Gyasi (1929 - 2012), Ghanaian musician
 Edwin Gyasi (born 1991), Dutch footballer
 Emanuel Quartsin Gyasi (born 1994), Ghanaian-Italian football player
 Jeff Gyasi (born 1989), Nigerian footballer
 Kwaku Gyasi, Ghanaian gospel singer
 Raymond Gyasi (born 1994), Ghanaian football winger  
 Yaa Gyasi (born 1989), Ghanaian-American novelist 
 Prince Gyasi Nyantakyi (born 1995), Ghanaian international visual artist

Surnames of Akan origin
Surnames of Ashanti origin